Marie Eggeling is a German silver-medallist World Champion bridge player. She came second in the Women's Pair event in Wroclaw in 2022.

Bridge accomplishments

Wins
 World Bridge Series Women Pairs (1) 2022

References

External links
 

German contract bridge players
Living people
Year of birth missing (living people)
Place of birth missing (living people)